The IW engine is a game engine created and developed by Infinity Ward for the Call of Duty series. The engine was originally based on id Tech 3. Aside from Infinity Ward, the engine is also used by other Activision studios working on the series, including primary lead developers Treyarch and Sledgehammer Games, and support studios like Beenox, High Moon Studios, and Raven Software.

History

IW 2.0 to IW 3.0
The engine has been distinct from the id Tech 3 engine on which it is based since Call of Duty 2 in 2005. The engine's name was not publicized until IGN was told at the E3 2009 by the studio that Call of Duty: Modern Warfare 2 would run on the "IW 4.0 engine". Development of the engine and the Call of Duty games has resulted in the inclusion of advanced graphical features while maintaining an average of 60 frames per second on the consoles and PC.

Call of Duty 4: Modern Warfare was released using version 3.0 of the engine. This game included features such as bullet penetration, improved AI, lighting engine upgrades,better explosions, particle system enhancements and many more improvements. Treyarch began using an enhanced version of the IW 3.0 engine for Call of Duty: World at War. Improvements were made to the physics model and dismemberment was added. Environments also featured more destructibility and could be set alight using a flamethrower. The flamethrower featured propagating fire and it was able to burn skin and clothes realistically. Treyarch modified the engine for their James Bond title, 007: Quantum of Solace.

IW 4.0 to IW 5.0
Call of Duty: Modern Warfare 2 was released using the IW 4.0 engine, the only game to do so. The IW 4.0 engine featured texture streaming technology to create much higher environmental detail without sacrificing performance. Call of Duty: Black Ops was not based on IW 4.0; rather, Treyarch further enhanced the version of IW 3.0 they had used in their previous game. This version of the engine also featured streaming technology, lighting enhancements, and support for 3D imaging. Call of Duty: Modern Warfare 3 utilizes an improved version of the IW 4.0 engine. Improvements on the engine allow better streaming technology which allows larger regions for the game while running at a minimum of 60 frames per second.  Further improvements to the audio and lighting engines have been made in this version.

Call of Duty: Black Ops II was developed using a further iteration of the IW engine. Texture blending has been improved due to a new technology called "reveal mapping" which compares tones between two textures and then blends them together. Also, there have been upgrades to the lighting engine which include HDR lighting, bounce lighting, self-shadowing, intersecting shadows and various other improvements. Call of Duty: Black Ops II takes advantage of DirectX 11 video cards on the Windows version of the game. The "zombie" mode has been moved to the multiplayer portion of the engine which will allow for much more variety within this part of the game.

IW 6.0 to IW 7.0
Call of Duty: Ghosts features an upgraded version of the IW 5.0 seen in Call of Duty: Modern Warfare 3. It is unknown at this time whether or not any engine features have been taken from Call of Duty: Black Ops II. Since the main developer is Infinity Ward they have returned to their original engine naming system and called this iteration IW 6.0. IW 6.0 is compatible with next-gen systems such as Xbox One and PlayStation 4 so polygon counts, texture detail and overall graphical fidelity has been increased. IW 6.0 is also compatible with Microsoft Windows, Wii U, PS3 and Xbox 360. The IW 6.0 engine features technology from Pixar, SubD, which increases the level of detail of models as one gets closer to them. Mark Rubin has said about the HDR lighting "We used to paint it in and cover up the cracks, but now it's all real-time". Ghosts uses Iris Adjust tech which allows the player to experience from a person's point of view how their eyes would react to changes in lighting conditions realistically. Other features include new animation systems, fluid dynamics, interactive smoke, displacement mapping and dynamic multiplayer maps.

Call of Duty: Advanced Warfare features Sledgehammer Games' in-house custom engine with only a few lines of legacy code remaining from the IW engine. Majority of the engine in Advanced Warfare had been built from the ground up. Developer Sledgehammer Games incorporated brand new animation, physics, rendering, lighting, motion capture and facial animation systems. Call of Duty: Black Ops III uses a highly upgraded version of the engine used in Black Ops II. Call of Duty: Infinite Warfares IW 7.0 features weightlessness system, game physics improvement, improved AI and improved non-player characters behaviors. Call of Duty: WWII uses an enhanced version of Sledgehammer Games' in-house custom engine from Advanced Warfare. For Call of Duty: Black Ops 4, Treyarch heavily modified the engine used in Black Ops III to support up to 100 players, and introduced a new 'Super Terrain' system.

IW 8.0 to IW 9.0
With Call of Duty: Modern Warfare and Call of Duty: Warzone, Infinity Ward employed their Poland studio to rebuild the engine completely. Dubbed IW 8.0, the engine was created within five years, and feature substantial upgrades such as spectral rendering, volumetric lighting and support for hardware-accelerated ray tracing on the PC version. Support for Nvidia's Deep Learning Super Sampling (DLSS) was added later in April 2021. Activision has stated that the new engine is also shared across the board for all Call of Duty developers to use in future titles. Call of Duty: Black Ops Cold War does not use this new engine, but instead uses a highly modified version of the Black Ops III engine. Call of Duty: Vanguard is powered by the same engine used in Modern Warfare and Warzone with enhancements from developer Sledgehammer Games.

Call of Duty: Modern Warfare II is developed on a highly upgraded version of the engine first used in 2019's Modern Warfare. Dubbed IW 9.0, the engine is co-developed by Infinity Ward, Treyarch, and Sledgehammer Games, and will be used in future installments of the series in a unified effort to ensure that every studio is working with the same tools.

Games using IW engine

References

2005 software
3D graphics software
Activision
Proprietary software
Video game engines

fr:Infinity Ward#Moteur de jeu